Sébastien Regy (born 27 March 1986 in Narbonne) is a French rugby union player. His position is fullback, centre, wing and he is a former player of RC Narbonne in the Pro D2 between 2006 until 2013, Regy scored 97 caps and 39 points. He also currently plays for Avenir Castanéen, known as Castanet RC in the Fédérale 1 since 2013.

References 

French rugby union players
Rugby union centres
Rugby union fullbacks
Rugby union wings
People from Narbonne
1986 births
Living people
Sportspeople from Aude
RC Narbonne players